Series 11 of Top Gear, a British motoring magazine and factual television programme, was broadcast in the United Kingdom on BBC Two during 2008, consisting of six episodes that were aired between 22 June and 27 July. This series saw the "Star in a Reasonably Priced Car" featuring two celebrities in each episode (with the exception of the final episode). This series' highlights included a race between a car and Japanese public transport, creating home-made police cars, and a showdown between Top Gear and its German counterpart.

Episodes

References

2007 British television seasons
Top Gear seasons